Sharyn McCrumb  (born February 26, 1948) is an American writer whose books celebrate the history and folklore of Appalachia.  McCrumb  is the winner of numerous literary awards, and the author of the Elizabeth McPherson mystery series, the Ballad series, and the St. Dale series.

Early life
Sharyn McCrumb was born Sharyn Elaine Arwood on February 26, 1948, in Wilmington, North Carolina.

Career
McCrumb is a Southern writer, perhaps best known for her Appalachian "Ballad" novels, including the New York Times best sellers The Ballad of Frankie Silver and She Walks These Hills, and for St. Dale, winner of a Library of Virginia Award and featured at the National Festival of the Book. The Devil Amongst the Lawyers (2010) deals with the regional stereotyping of rural areas by national journalists. The Ballad of Tom Dooley (2011) tells the true story behind the celebrated folk song. In 2008 McCrumb was named a Virginia Woman of History for Achievement in Literature.

Educated at the University of North Carolina at Chapel Hill with a master's degree in English from Virginia Tech, McCrumb was the first writer-in-residence at King College in Tennessee. In 2005 she was honored as the Writer of the Year at Emory & Henry College.

Her novels, studied in universities throughout the world, have been translated into eleven languages, including French, German, Dutch, Japanese, Arabic, and Italian. She has lectured on her work at Oxford University, the University of Bonn-Germany, and at the Smithsonian Institution. McCrumb has also taught a writers workshop in Paris and served as writer-in-residence at King College in Tennessee and at the Chautauqua Institute in western New York.

In 2008 McCrumb was honored as one of the Library of Virginia's "Virginia Women in History" for her career.

Novels
McCrumb is the author of The Ballad Novels, a series set in the Appalachian Mountains. These books weave together the legends, geography and contemporary issues of Appalachia, and each centers on an event from North Carolina history. She is also the author of the Elizabeth MacPherson mystery series, though her career has evolved beyond genre fiction.

Ballad series

 
 
 

McCrumb, Sharyn (2013). King's Mountain. Thomas Dunne Books. 
McCrumb, Sharyn (2014). Nora Bonesteel's Christmas Past. Abingdon Press. 
McCrumb, Sharyn (2016). Prayers the Devil Answers. Atria Books.  
McCrumb, Sharyn (2017). The Unquiet Grave. Atria Books.

St. Dale novels
In 2005, NASCAR racing fan McCrumb wrote St. Dale. Her inspiration for the novel came from her study of medieval literature at Virginia Tech and her desire to update Geoffrey Chaucer's The Canterbury Tales.  It was Dale Earnhardt who became the saint of her tale, complete with the Dale Earnhardt Pilgrimage of fans.

Elizabeth MacPherson novels

Jay Omega novels
These are satirical novels set in the world of science fiction conventions and fandom.

Short story collections
  (Co-author: Mona Walton Helper)

Awards
Winners are in bold

References

External links

McCrumb's biography at the Library of Virginia
Excerpts from “Keepers of the Legend: An Essay on the Influences of Family Legends and Folklore on Fiction” By Sharyn McCrumb at the Library of Virginia

1948 births
Living people
20th-century American novelists
21st-century American novelists
American mystery writers
American women novelists
Appalachian writers
Edgar Award winners
Agatha Award winners
Writers from Wilmington, North Carolina
University of North Carolina at Chapel Hill alumni
Virginia Tech alumni
Nero Award winners
Anthony Award winners
Macavity Award winners
Women mystery writers
20th-century American women writers
21st-century American women writers
Novelists from North Carolina